Lang Lang East is a bounded rural locality in Victoria, Australia,  south-east of Melbourne's Central Business District, located within the Shire of Cardinia local government area. Lang Lang East recorded a population of 94 at the 2021 census.

History

A Lang Lang East Post Office opened on 16 March 1885 but was replaced by Nyora in 1890.

References

Shire of Cardinia